Philipp Reiter (born 20 July 1991) is a German ski mountaineer and mountain runner. He is member of the German national selection of ski mountaineering.

Reiter was born in Munich. He started ski mountaineering in 2001, and competed for the first time in 2006. He currently lives in Bad Reichenhall, where he visited the Karlsgymnasium. He studies mathematics and biology at the University of Salzburg.

Selected results

Ski mountaineering 
 2011:
 6th, World Championship, relay, together with Anton Palzer, Anton Steurer and Konrad Lex
 2012:
 5th, European Championship, relay, together with Josef Rottmoser, Anton Palzer and Alexander Schuster
 1st, Olympus Ski Mountaineering Team Race, together with Aronis Platonis

Running 
 2011:
 1st, Zugspitz Supertrail
 2nd, 4 Trails

External links 
 Philipp Reiter, skimountaineering.com

References 

1991 births
Living people
German male ski mountaineers
German male long-distance runners
German male mountain runners
Sportspeople from Munich
German sky runners
20th-century German people
21st-century German people